The Rt Rev Peter Sorenson Royston (6 June 1830 - 28 January 1915)
was a Bishop of Mauritius.

Born in London on 6 June 1830 and educated at St Paul’s and  Trinity College, Cambridge, he was ordained in 1853 and began his career as a Resident Tutor  at the Church Missionary College in London.  After that he was the incumbent of the CMS Chapel, Madras and then of St Thomas’, Mauritius. He was Bishop of the country from 1872 to 1891 when he resigned through ill health. Afterwards, an Assistant Bishop within the Diocese of Liverpool  he died on 28 January  1915 at Worthing.

Notes

1836 births
Roman Catholic clergy from London
People educated at St Paul's School, London
Alumni of Trinity College, Cambridge
English Anglican missionaries
Bishops of Dover, Kent
1915 deaths
Missionary educators
Anglican missionaries in Mauritius
British Mauritius people
Anglican missionaries in India
Anglican bishops of Mauritius